Ladmokh or Ladmakh may refer to:
 Ladmokh, Fuman
 Ladmokh, Sowme'eh Sara